The Cochin College, located at Kochi, Kerala, India, is an accredited first grade Arts, Science and Commerce College affiliated to Mahatma Gandhi University, Kerala, India.

The Cochin College is one of the oldest Arts and Science colleges located in Kochi. Founded on 15 July 1967 as a junior college, the institution grew into a postgraduate college in 1995. In February 2012, the college was accredited by NAAC with B Grade (2.85). The Cochin College is sponsored by the Cochin Education Society which was founded as a result of the joint efforts of Indian Chamber of Commerce and the former Mattancherry Municipal Council. The College is affiliated to Mahatma Gandhi University, Kottayam.

Departments
English
Mathematics
Physics
Chemistry
Zoology
Botany
Economics
Commerce
Physical education
Additional languages (Malayalam, Hindi & French)

Courses

Three year graduate courses

 B.A. English (History of British Colonialism, World History)
 B.A. Economics (Indian History, Mathematics)
 B.Sc Physics (Electronics, Maths)
 B.Sc Chemistry (Mathematics, Physics)
 B.Sc Zoology (Botany, Chemistry)
 BBA (Bachelor of Business Administration)
 BCA (Bachelor of Computer Application)
 B.Com (Taxation)
 B.Com (Marketing)
 B.Com Finance & Taxation
 B.Com Computer Application

Vocational and semester system

 B.Sc Botany (Biotechnology (v))
 B.Sc Mathematics (Computer Science (v))

Two year postgraduate courses

 M.A - English Language and Literature
 M.Com - Financial Stream
 M.Sc - Physics with Electronics
 M.Sc - Chemistry
 M.Sc - Microbiology

Notable alumni
 Rosshan Andrrews, Malayalam film director 
 Shaiju Damodaran, TV Commentator
 Kuldeep Pai, Musician

References

External links
http://thecochincollege.edu.in

Universities and colleges in Kochi
Arts and Science colleges in Kerala
Colleges affiliated to Mahatma Gandhi University, Kerala
1967 establishments in Kerala
Educational institutions established in 1967

List of colleges affiliated with Mahatma Gandhi University, Kerala#Art and Sciences